Padua College is a Catholic co-educational Secondary College located in Victoria, Australia. The college derives its name from Franciscan friar Saint Anthony of Padua (1195–1231). The Mornington campus alone provides for approximately 2,404 students from across the Mornington Peninsula. The college also has two smaller campuses that cater for students in years 7-9 in Rosebud and in Tyabb.

Facilities at the Mornington campus include the newly established 'Whyte Senior Learning Centre' as well as 'St Clare Performing Arts Centre', bird hide and wetlands/bushland areas, aquarium, drama rooms, art and media rooms, gymnasium, chapel, library, music rooms, tennis courts, basketball courts, food technology rooms, an agriculture/horticulture centre and two ovals.

History
In 1898 the Sisters of Mercy opened the College of Our Lady of the Sea Boarding School for Young Ladies in Tanti Avenue, Mornington. In the following year, the Sisters established a separate school, Padua House Preparatory School for Little Boys .

The name 'Padua College' had been   assumed by 1950 with the Sisters being encouraged to enrol  more day  boys and having  Padua operating  only as a junior boys boarding school.  By 1960, there was no longer a need for a boarding school for either sex. 

Another important date in Padua College’s history is 1968 when the primary section separated to become St Macartan’s Parish Primary School. Both schools continued to grow and in 1973 plans were drawn up for Padua College to be relocated to Oakbank Road, Mornington, which opened in 1975. An official opening ceremony was held later, in February 1977. As enrolments increased a second campus was established at Inglewood Crescent, Rosebud in 1987 and a third at Tyabb in 2014.

The administration of the College passed from the Sisters of Mercy in 1976 to lay principals, including Bernard McDowell (1977 – 1983), Peter Gurry (1984 – 1995), Patricia Cowling (1995 – 2000) and Christopher Houlihan (2001-2015). The present principal, Anthony Banks, commenced in January 2016.

Houses

Campuses

Mornington 
The Junior Campus offers approximately 910 students from Years 7-9 a comprehensive range of subjects. Year 10, 11 and 12 students are located in the Senior Campus which is separate from the rest of the College. There are approximately 600 senior students, who may choose to undertake various courses of study including the Victorian Certificate of Education (VCE), the Victorian Certificate of Applied Learning (VCAL) and Vocational Education and Training (VET). Senior Campus facilities include a study centre with networked computers, specialised science and computer laboratories, an agriculture centre and gymnasium.

Rosebud 
The Rosebud Campus was opened in 1987. The campus is designed on a homestead model. There has been a particular effort to use indigenous plants in the College grounds. The Rosebud Campus students move across to the Mornington Year 10-12 Campus for their senior studies.

Tyabb 
The Tyabb Campus opened in January 2014, and draws upon students who live in the Western Port region. It is located on Frankston Flinders Road at the corner of Western Port Highway. Students at Tyabb Campus are offered the same opportunities as the Year 7-9 students at the Mornington and Rosebud Campuses. The Tyabb Campus students also move across to the Mornington Year 10-12 Campus for their senior studies.

Sport 
Padua College is a member of the Southern Independent Schools (SIS).

SIS premierships 
Padua College has won the following SIS senior premierships.

Combined:

 Athletics (11) - 1999, 2000, 2001, 2011, 2012, 2014, 2015, 2016, 2017, 2018, 2019
 Cross Country (32) - 1988, 1989, 1990, 1991, 1992, 1993, 1994, 1995, 1996, 1997, 1998, 1999, 2000, 2001, 2002, 2003, 2004, 2005, 2006, 2007, 2008, 2009, 2010, 2011, 2012, 2013, 2014, 2015, 2016, 2017, 2018, 2019
 Swimming (29) - 1988, 1990, 1991, 1992, 1993, 1994, 1995, 1996, 1997, 1998, 1999, 2000, 2001, 2002, 2003, 2004, 2005, 2006, 2007, 2008, 2009, 2010, 2011, 2012, 2013, 2014, 2015, 2016, 2017

Boys:

 Basketball - 2016
 Cricket (3) - 2003, 2009, 2011
 Football (5) - 2001, 2002, 2003, 2017, 2018
 Indoor Cricket (3) - 2018, 2019, 2020
 Soccer (2) - 2011, 2015

Girls:

 Basketball - 2015
 Football (3) - 2005, 2017, 2019
 Netball (4) - 2013, 2014, 2015, 2018
 Soccer - 2019

Notable alumni 
 Elizabeth Cambage, WNBL basketball player
Ned Cahill, AFL football player for the Essendon Football Club 
Christopher Chung (actor), actor
 Hunter Clark, AFL football player for the St. Kilda Football Club 
Simon Cook, Australian Cricketer 
Luke Davies-Uniacke, AFL football player for the North Melbourne Football Club 
 Paul Dempsey, solo musician and songwriter, vocalist and guitarist, Something for Kate
Sam De Koning, AFL football player for the Geelong Football Club
 Tom De Koning, AFL football player for the Carlton Football Club
 Mitch Hallahan, AFL football player for the Gold Coast Suns
Will Hamill, AFL football player for the Adelaide Football Club
 Lee Harding, singer
 Bridie Kennedy, AFLW football player for the Carlton Football Club
 Tom Lynch, AFL football player for the Richmond Football Club and 2019, 2020 Premiership Player
 Darren Minchington, AFL football player for the St Kilda Football Club
Jake Mold, Solo musician
 Myles Poholke, AFL football player for the Adelaide Football Club
Billy Sakalis, Professional Cricketer
 Toby Thurstans, AFL football player for the Port Adelaide Football Club
 Nicky Whelan, actress and model

References 

Educational institutions established in 1898
1898 establishments in Australia
Catholic secondary schools in Melbourne
Buildings and structures in the Shire of Mornington Peninsula